Nancy Atiez (11 March 1957 – November 2016) was a Cuban basketball player. She competed in the women's tournament at the 1980 Summer Olympics.

References

External links
 

1957 births
2016 deaths
Cuban women's basketball players
Olympic basketball players of Cuba
Basketball players at the 1980 Summer Olympics
Place of birth missing
Basketball players at the 1979 Pan American Games
Pan American Games gold medalists for Cuba
Medalists at the 1979 Pan American Games
Pan American Games medalists in basketball